Patryk Słotwiński (born 27 April 1994) is a Polish footballer who plays as a defender for Tomasovia Tomaszów Lubelski. He has previously played for Stal Mielec, Wisła Puławy, Motor Lublin, and Hetman Zamość.

Career
Słotwiński began his career at Tomasovia Tomaszów Lubelski. In February 2014, he signed for II liga club Stal Mielec, and he made his professional debut on 9 March 2014 in a 1–3 home loss against Legionovia Legionowo, coming on as a substitute in the 62nd minute.

On 23 July 2015, it was announced that Słotwiński had signed with I liga side Wisła Puławy. His debut for Wisła came two days later, where he scored goal in Polish Cup tie against Zagłębie Sosnowiec.

On 19 January 2017, Słotwiński signed one-and-a-half year contract with Motor Lublin. On 12 July 2018, he signed a new one-year deal with Motor, keeping him at the club until the end of the 2018–19 season. On 11 December 2018, his contract was terminated by mutual agreement.

In January 2019, he signed a contract with Hetman Zamość until the end of the 2018–19 season.

References

External links
 

1994 births
People from Tomaszów Lubelski
Stal Mielec players
Motor Lublin players
Tomasovia Tomaszów Lubelski players
Wisła Puławy players
Association football midfielders
Polish footballers
Living people